Glassport Motor Company (GSM) was a South African motor manufacturer based in Cape Town between 1958 and 1964. They produced the Dart and Flamingo sports cars. The name Glass Sport Motors is due to their use of fiberglass. GSM narrowly missed being South Africas first sports car maker, beaten by the GRP Protea. A Dart, Flamingo and Protea can be viewed at the Franschhoek Motor Museum in South Africa.

History
The company was founded by Bob van Niekerk and Willie Meissner in 1958 after Meissner went to England and stumbled upon fiberglass, a new technology at the time. He wrote a letter to van Niekerk asking him to come to England and further study fiberglass crafting. They came into contact with South African designer Verster de Wit (who was working on the Sunbeam Alpine) who helped them style their first car design and taught them the design process. The pair finally found an attractive design and produced a mould. One body was made and sold in England to fund Bob's trip back to South Africa. On returning to South Africa, they built the first prototypes of the GSM Dart. GSM's were mainly sold in South Africa and England although several seem to have made it to Canada.

The Dart

The Dart was GSM's first production model. The car used a variety of engines including Coventry Climax Ford Anglia 100E and 105E as well as 4 fitted with Alfa Romeo 1300cc units nestled into a ladder type chassis with transverse springs at the front and coil springs at the rear. 
Cars had a glass fibre open two seat body fitted, but a hardtop was later available which had a reverse slanted rear window which later Fords also exhibited.
Yet other versions included Alfa Romeo S.V. engines. Ernest Pieterse was the first to try this form of motive power. Requiring a machine for the Nine Hours Race (S.A.'s classic sports-car race), and having to beat such machines as Porsche Carreras, Ernest bought a Dart and fitted disc brakes, Alfa S.V.+ engine, etc. In the said Nine Hours Race, the car led for a while but retired with boiling brake fluid. This let John Love's Carrera into the lead but it too retired, or was delayed, and another Dart with 1,100-c.c. Climax engine stepped into the breach and was leading after nine hours. This was 1959. Since then Porsche Spyders and Lotus Fifteens have been used in the Nine Hours, rather squashing anyone with aspirations of further wins in a GSM Dart.

The Dart was also manufactured at West Malling, Kent, England by GSM Cars where it was known as the GSM Delta due to 'Dart' being a registered trademark of Chrysler, the Daimler Dart also had to be renamed.

The Flamingo

The Flamingo coupé was produced by GSM from 1962. The original intention was to use a forthcoming Ford V6 but it did not appear in time and so it was initially powered by a 1.7-litre Ford Taunus engine and later by the 1.5-litre Ford Cortina (non-crossflow) engine. Although similar in appearance, the Flamingo is a very different car. The front suspension replaced the transverse leaf springs of the Dart with two wishbones compressing Mini rubber cones, and later small coil springs. The rear was cleverly designed to stop one wheel spinning faster than the other under power through the use of different trailing arm setups on each side.

Owners include Gordon Murray who has a 1964 example.

Replicas

In the 1980s a series of accurate replicas known as Levy Darts were built by Jeff Levy with involvement from one of the original trio, Verster de Wit. In the 1990s a visually similar mechanically different replica in the form of the Hayden Dart II was manufactured; these are still being made and have evolved to include independent rear suspension. Engine options are wide as with the original GSM's: the Kent 1600 and Toyota 4A-GE are the most common options, but there are examples with Mazda Rotary Turbo, Toyota 4A-GZE, and various other engines.

References

External links
 The GSM club website
 The GSM section of Bob van Niekerk's website
 Franschhoek Motor Museum Flamingo
 Franschhoek Motor Museum Dart

Car manufacturers of South Africa
Manufacturing companies based in Cape Town
1958 establishments in South Africa
Cars of South Africa